Neorthacris is a genus of wingless grasshoppers in the Pyrgomorphidae. Species in the genus are found in South Asia, mainly in subcontinental India.

Species
Species in the genus include:
 Neorthacris acuticeps (Bolívar, 1902)N. a. acuticeps (Bolívar, 1902) - type species (as Orthacris acuticeps Bolívar)N. a. nilgirensis (Uvarov, 1929)
 Neorthacris longicercata Singh & Kevan, 1965
 Neorthacris malabarensis Singh & Kevan, 1965
 Neorthacris palnensis (Uvarov, 1929)
 Neorthacris simulans (Bolívar, 1902)

References 

Orthoptera genera
Pyrgomorphidae